John Mills (11 August 1789 – 18 February 1871) was a British soldier, politician and amateur cricketer who played first-class cricket from 1816 to 1820.

He was the eldest son of William Mills, a director of the Honourable East India Company, and the elder brother of Sir Charles Mills, 1st Baronet.

Mills was educated at Harrow and Christ Church, Oxford, matriculating on 22 October 1807. He was commissioned an ensign in the Coldstream Guards on 27 December 1809. Mainly associated with Hampshire, he made 9 known appearances in first-class matches. He played for the Gentlemen in the Gentlemen v Players series. Mills served with the regiment during the Peninsular War and in Holland. He was promoted lieutenant and captain on 10 January 1814.

Mills was later appointed a verderer of the New Forest. He was elected as a Tory (and later Conservative) Member of Parliament (MP) for Rochester at the 1831 general election having contested the seat unsuccessfully in 1830. He was re-elected in 1832, and held the seat until he stood down at the 1835 general election. He was High Sheriff of Hampshire in 1839, and was appointed a deputy lieutenant in 1846. He died in 1871 at his estate of Bisterne.

Further reading
 Arthur Haygarth, Scores & Biographies, Volumes 1-11 (1744–1870), Lillywhite, 1862–72

References

External links 

 CricketArchive profile

1789 births
1871 deaths
Alumni of Christ Church, Oxford
Coldstream Guards officers
Tory MPs (pre-1834)
Conservative Party (UK) MPs for English constituencies
Deputy Lieutenants of Hampshire
English cricketers
English cricketers of 1787 to 1825
Gentlemen cricketers
Hampshire cricketers
High Sheriffs of Hampshire
People educated at Harrow School
UK MPs 1831–1832
UK MPs 1832–1835
Marylebone Cricket Club cricketers
E. H. Budd's XI cricketers
Non-international England cricketers